2-Aminofluorene (2-AF) is a synthetic arylamine.  It is a white to tan solid with a melting
point of 125-132 °C.  2-AF has only been tested in controlled laboratory settings thus far. There is no indication that it will be tested in industrialized settings. There is evidence that 2-aminofluorene is a carcinogen and an intercalating agent that is extremely dangerous to genomic DNA that potentially can lead to mutation if not death. Furthermore, it has been suggested that 2-aminofluorene can undergo acetylation reactions that causes these reactive species to undergo such reactions in cells. Several experiments have been conducted that have suggested 2-aminofluorene be treated with care and with an overall awareness of the toxicity of this compound.

Structure and properties
2-Aminofluorene is used in laboratory research settings, in which it is converted into differentiating substances that can be harmful to deoxyribonucleic acids. Reactive species can be formed from its original structure. 2-AF has 3 cyclic rings: a benzene attached to a cyclopentane which is attached to another benzene. The functional group is a primary amine, which can act as a hydrogen donor or acceptor under certain conditions. Therefore, it can become reactive under such laboratory settings. Furthermore, benzene rings are able to interact with other substances which can be rationalized in the Reactions section below. 

2-Aminofluorene is a relatively bulky molecule. The average mass is about 181 Daltons and its melting point ranges from 125°C-132°C. This molecule can be converted to other molecules when metabolized. Therefore, it is mostly used as a model compound that can help researches study carcinogens and the functionality of such compounds that are similar in structure to 2-AF. 2-Acetylaminofluorene (2-AAF) is used similarly to 2-AF because of the nature of these molecules.

Uses in research

There have been experiments carried out using 2-AF as a possible mutagen that can be introduced into a host species. For example, it has been shown that human leukocytes are able to metabolize 2-AF into a human mutagen. When inserted into Salmonella, it was noted that 2-AF was metabolized and created a mutagenic strain of Salmonella. In other species, 2-AF was also the cause of mutations in the host genome. The leukocytes, in particular, were able to uptake this foreign particle and the researchers were able to conclude that the metabolism of 2-AF was the precursor to the tumor formation.

Toxicity and reactions
2-AF can undergo a reaction to become a toxic carcinogen to animals. 2-AF can be acetylated to become 2-acetylaminofluorene (2-AAF). This compound has been a major research area for cancer-causing agents. 2-Acetylaminofluorene is able to cause tumors in mice and other animals in the liver and kidney. This substance can act as a substrate for cytochrome P450 (CYP). In this lock and key conformation, the enzyme will allow for a hydroxyl group to be added onto the 2nd carbon of the structure. Now, 2-AAF will be turned into N-hydroxy-2-acetylaminofluorene which is a carcinogen. The addition of these side groups to 2-AF are very dangerous in biological systems. Industrial use has still yet to experimented with. After this reaction to form the N-hydroxy-2-acetylaminofluorene, there can be spontaneous formations that will form. The transferase enzyme, cytosolic N-acetyltransferase can act on the hydroxyl group which can also be acetylated. This oxygen acetylation will create the intermediate N-acetyl-N acetoxyaminofluorene. Since biological molecules are dynamic and able to undergo several movements, the side groups of the N-acteyl-N-acetoxyaminofluorene can form the arylamidonium ion and a carbonium ion which can interact directly with DNA. Exposure to these carcinogens can increase metabolic rates, if the exposure is repeated several times. Gradually, the doses can increase and residues in urine excretion can gradually increase. This is carcinogenic and exposure should be limited. These carcinogens can affect the genome induce mutations. Furthermore, the N-hydroxy derivative can undergo sulfation by the enzyme cytosolic sulfur transferase, which will produce another compound, N-acetyl-N-sulfoxy.

Biological interactions

2-AF is able to induce tumors in the livers of male and female rats. Additionally, this chemical can cause mammary gland tumors in female rats. Its carcinogenic nature is unnatural and introduces rare tumors in the ear ducts and small intestines in rats. 2-AF is a mutagen and causes genetic mutations, DNA damage, chromosomal transformations, and sister-chromatid exchanges in animal genomes. The toxicity should be noted because of its metabolic effects it can have. In biological systems, the conversion of 2-AF to different forms can react with DNA. 

In molecular biology, 2-AF is able to induce frameshift mutations, by deleting 2 bases in the DNA.
DNA is able to undergo a transition from one conformation form, B-DNA, to another, Z-DNA. B-DNA is the natural state that DNA is found in animals, and shifting the conformation to Z-DNA is especially harmful to biological systems. Z-DNA has less base pairs per turn and in turn, the DNA is more reactive and unable to act under normal conditions. This form of DNA will not be able to interact with enzymes, histone proteins, and other molecules the way it normally would. The implications of this reaction is that site-specific or non-specific interactions with other molecules is severely shifted to be prone to mutations during replication of the genome. If DNA mutations occur during DNA replication, this will ultimately affect the central dogma and every protein that gets translated. Mutations ultimately affect the production of proteins and at times, it can be quite fatal.

Applications
2-AF is not common in industrial settings. It is, though, commonly used in laboratory settings because of mutagenic nature. The observation of 2-aminofluorene that it is related to genetic mutations, DNA damage, chromosomal aberrations, and sister-chromatid exchanges.

References

External Links
http://oehha.ca.gov/prop65/pdf/hid2amin.pdf 

Anilines
Fluorenes